In mathematics, an element x of a *-algebra is normal if  it satisfies   

This definition stems from the definition of a normal linear operator in functional analysis, where a linear operator A from a Hilbert space into itself is called unitary if  where the adjoint of A is A and the domain of A is the same as that of A. See normal operator for a detailed discussion.  If the Hilbert space is finite-dimensional and an orthonormal basis has been chosen, then the operator A is normal if and only if the matrix describing A with respect to this basis is a normal matrix.

See also

References 

 
 
  

Abstract algebra
Linear algebra